is a series of television commercials launched by The Coca-Cola Company to promote the Georgia canned coffee in Japan between 2000 to 2003. The campaign focuses on a Salaryman during Lost Decades on the stage of a Trading company. The Ashita Ga Arusa campaign was handled by Beacon Communications, a local advertising agency based in Shinagawa. The campaign was a critical and financial success, that it spawned a Japanese television drama adaptations that aired on NTV in 2001. and a feature film released in 2002

Cast
 Masatoshi Hamada
 Izumi Inamori
 Takashi Fujii
 Kōji Higashino
 Shozo Endo
 Naoki Tanaka
 Hitoshi Matsumoto

References

External links
 

2000s television commercials
2001 Japanese television series debuts
2001 Japanese television series endings
Japanese television commercials
Promotional campaigns by Coca-Cola
Nippon TV dramas